The 2020–21 New York Rangers season was the franchise's 94th season of play and their 95th season overall. Following the buyout of his contract on September 30, 2020, Henrik Lundqvist was not on the roster for the first time since the 2005–06 season. Before the season, the Rangers received the first overall pick in the draft lottery of the 2020 NHL Entry Draft. They drafted Alexis Lafreniere, who became only the second player to be drafted first overall by the Rangers, after Andre Veilleux in 1965. On December 20, 2020, the league temporarily realigned into four divisions with no conferences due to the COVID-19 pandemic and the ongoing closure of the Canada–United States border. As a result of this realignment, the Rangers played this season in the East Division and only played games against the other teams in their new division during the regular season.

Fan attendance in home games was prohibited until February 23, 2021, per an executive order from Governor of New York Andrew Cuomo. The Rangers reopened Madison Square Garden to spectators on February 26.

On March 17, head coach David Quinn and his assistant coaches, Jacques Martin, David Oliver, and Greg Brown were unavailable to coach the Rangers' game against the Philadelphia Flyers because of COVID-19 protocols and health and safety guidelines. A temporary coaching staff was called in and the team was coached by head coach Kris Knoblauch and assistant coach Gord Murphy from the AHL's Hartford Wolf Pack, and the team's associate general manager Chris Drury. This was the first time in the NHL an entire coaching staff was not allowed to be in the arena to coach a game due to a pandemic. The Rangers won the game 9–0, which was the largest margin of victory since March 31, 1986, when they won 9–0 against the New Jersey Devils.

The Rangers scored the most hat tricks of any NHL team during the season. The players were – Mika Zibanejad (3), Chris Kreider (2), and Pavel Buchnevich (1). This was the most since the 1991–92 season when the team had eight.

On May 3, the Rangers were eliminated from playoff contention after a 6–3 loss to the Washington Capitals. Two days later, Rangers general manager Jeff Gorton and president/alternative governor John Davidson were both relieved of their duties by the organization. They were replaced by former Rangers captain Chris Drury who was named the new president and general manager.

On May 12, the Rangers fired head coach David Quinn by team's president Chris Drury after the team failed to make the playoffs. Assistant coaches Jacques Martin, David Oliver and Greg Brown were also fired.

Standings

Divisional standings

Schedule and results

Regular season
The regular season schedule was published on December 23, 2020.

|- style="background:#fcc;"
| 1 || January 14 || NY Islanders || 0–4 || || Shestyorkin || Madison Square Garden || 0 || 0–1–0 || 0 || 
|- style="background:#cfc;"
| 2 || January 16 || NY Islanders || 5–0 || || Georgiev || Madison Square Garden || 0 || 1–1–0 || 2 ||  
|- style="background:#fcc;"
| 3 || January 19 || New Jersey || 3–4 || || Georgiev || Madison Square Garden || 0 || 1–2–0 || 2 || 
|- style="background:#fff;"
| 4 || January 22 || @ Pittsburgh || 3–4 || SO || Shestyorkin || PPG Paints Arena || 0 || 1–2–1 || 3 || 
|- style="background:#fcc;"
| 5 || January 24 || @ Pittsburgh || 2–3 || || Shestyorkin || PPG Paints Arena || 0 || 1–3–1 || 3 || 
|- style="background:#fcc;"
| 6 || January 26 || @ Buffalo || 2–3 || || Georgiev || KeyBank Center || 0 || 1–4–1 || 3 ||  
|- style="background:#cfc;"
| 7 || January 28 || @ Buffalo || 3–2 || OT || Shestyorkin || KeyBank Center || 0 || 2–4–1 || 5 ||  
|- style="background:#fff;"
| 8 || January 30 || Pittsburgh || 4–5 || OT || Georgiev || Madison Square Garden || 0 || 2–4–2 || 6 ||  
|-

|- style="background:#cfc;"
| 9 || February 1 || Pittsburgh || 3–1 || || Shestyorkin || Madison Square Garden || 0 || 3–4–2 || 8 ||  
|- style="background:#cfc;"
| 10 || February 4 || Washington || 4–2 || || Shestyorkin || Madison Square Garden || 0 || 4–4–2 || 10 ||  
|- style="background:#ccc;"
| — || February 6 || @ New Jersey || – || colspan="7"|Postponed due to COVID-19 protocol; moved to March 4
|- style="background:#fcc;"
| 11 || February 8 || NY Islanders || 0–2 || || Shestyorkin || Madison Square Garden || 0 || 4–5–2 || 10 || 
|- style="background:#fff;"
| 12 || February 10 || Boston || 2–3 || OT || Georgiev || Madison Square Garden || 0 || 4–5–3 || 11 ||  
|- style="background:#fcc;"
| 13 || February 12 || Boston || 0–1 || || Shestyorkin || Madison Square Garden || 0 || 4–6–3 || 11 || 
|- style="background:#ccc;"
| — || February 14 || Philadelphia || – || colspan="7"|Postponed due to COVID-19 protocol; moved to April 22
|- style="background:#fcc;"
| 14 || February 16 || New Jersey || 2–5 || || Shestyorkin || Madison Square Garden || 0 || 4–7–3 || 11 || 
|- style="background:#cfc;"
| 15 || February 18 || @ Philadelphia || 3–2 || SO || Georgiev || Wells Fargo Center || 0 || 5–7–3 || 13 || 
|- style="background:#cfc;"
| 16 || February 20 || @ Washington || 4–1 || || Shestyorkin || Capital One Arena || 0 || 6–7–3 || 15 || 
|- style="background:#fcc;"
| 17 || February 24 || @ Philadelphia || 3–4 || || Shestyorkin || Wells Fargo Center || 0 || 6–8–3 || 15 || 
|- style="background:#cfc;"
| 18 || February 26 || Boston || 6–2 || || Georgiev || Madison Square Garden || 1,800 || 7–8–3 || 17 ||  
|- style="background:#fcc;"
| 19 || February 28 || Boston || 1–4 || || Shestyorkin || Madison Square Garden || 1,800 || 7–9–3 || 17 || 
|-

|- style="background:#cfc;"
| 20 || March 2 || Buffalo || 3–2 || || Shestyorkin || Madison Square Garden || 1,800 || 8–9–3 || 19 || 
|- style="background:#cfc;"
| 21 || March 4 || @ New Jersey || 6–1 || || Shestyorkin || Prudential Center || 1,800 || 9–9–3 || 21 || 
|- style="background:#cfc;"
| 22 || March 6 || @ New Jersey || 6–3 || || Georgiev || Prudential Center || 1,800 || 10–9–3 || 23 || 
|- style="background:#fcc;"
| 23 || March 7 || @ Pittsburgh || 1–5 || || Georgiev || PPG Paints Arena || 2,800 || 10–10–3 || 23 || 
|- style="background:#fcc;"
| 24 || March 9 || @ Pittsburgh || 2–4 || || Kinkaid || PPG Paints Arena || 2,800 || 10–11–3 || 23 || 
|- style="background:#fcc;"
| 25 || March 11 || @ Boston || 0–4 || || Georgiev || TD Garden || 0 || 10–12–3 || 23 || 
|- style="background:#cfc;"
| 26 || March 13 || @ Boston || 4–0 || || Kinkaid || TD Garden || 0 || 11–12–3 || 25 ||  
|- style="background:#fff;"
| 27 || March 15 || Philadelphia || 4–5 || OT || Kinkaid || Madison Square Garden || 1,639 || 11–12–4 || 26 ||  
|- style="background:#cfc;"
| 28 || March 17 || Philadelphia || 9–0 || || Georgiev || Madison Square Garden || 1,723 || 12–12–4 || 28 ||  
|- style="background:#fcc;"
| 29 || March 19 || @ Washington || 1–2 || || Georgiev || Capital One Arena || 0 || 12–13–4 || 28 || 
|- style="background:#cfc;"
| 30 || March 20 || @ Washington || 3–1 || || Kinkaid || Capital One Arena || 0 || 13–13–4 || 30 || 
|- style="background:#cfc;"
| 31 || March 22 || Buffalo || 5–3 || || Kinkaid || Madison Square Garden || 1,800 || 14–13–4 || 32 || 
|- style="background:#cfc;"
| 32 || March 25 || @ Philadelphia || 8–3 || || Shestyorkin || Wells Fargo Center || 2,854 || 15–13–4 || 34 || 
|- style="background:#fcc;"
| 33 || March 27 || @ Philadelphia || 1–2 || || Shestyorkin || Wells Fargo Center || 3,069 || 15–14–4 || 34 || 
|- style="background:#fcc;"
| 34 || March 28 || @ Washington || 4–5 || || Kinkaid || Capital One Arena || 0 || 15–15–4 || 34 || 
|- style="background:#cfc;"
| 35 || March 30 || Washington || 5–2 || || Shestyorkin || Madison Square Garden || 1,761 || 16–15–4 || 36 || 
|-

|- style="background:#cfc;"
| 36 || April 1 || @ Buffalo || 3–2 || OT || Shestyorkin || KeyBank Center || 0 || 17–15–4 || 38 || 
|- style="background:#fff;"
| 37 || April 3 || @ Buffalo || 2–3 || SO || Shestyorkin || KeyBank Center || 302 || 17–15–5 || 39 || 
|- style="background:#cfc;"
| 38 || April 6 || Pittsburgh || 8–4 || || Shestyorkin || Madison Square Garden || 1,693 || 18–15–5 || 41 || 
|- style="background:#fcc;"
| 39 || April 8 || Pittsburgh || 2–5 || || Shestyorkin || Madison Square Garden || 1,800 || 18–16–5 || 41 || 
|- style="background:#cfc;"
| 40 || April 9 || @ NY Islanders || 4–1 || || Georgiev || Nassau Coliseum || 1,400 || 19–16–5 || 43 || 
|- style="background:#fff;"
| 41 || April 11 || @ NY Islanders || 2–3 || OT || Shestyorkin || Nassau Coliseum || 1,400 || 19–16–6 || 44 || 
|- style="background:#cfc;"
| 42 || April 13 || @ New Jersey || 3–0 || || Shestyorkin || Prudential Center || 3,600 || 20–16–6 || 46 || 
|- style="background:#cfc;"
| 43 || April 15 || New Jersey || 4–0 || || Shestyorkin || Madison Square Garden || 1,688 || 21–16–6 || 48 || 
|- style="background:#cfc;"
| 44 || April 17 || New Jersey || 6–3 || || Shestyorkin || Madison Square Garden || 1,800 || 22–16–6 || 50 || 
|- style="background:#cfc;"
| 45 || April 18 || @ New Jersey || 5–3 || || Georgiev || Prudential Center || 3,500 || 23–16–6 || 52 || 
|- style="background:#fcc;"
| 46 || April 20 || @ NY Islanders || 1–6 || || Shestyorkin || Nassau Coliseum || 1,400 || 23–17–6 || 52 || 
|- style="background:#fcc;"
| 47 || April 22 || Philadelphia || 2–3 || || Shestyorkin || Madison Square Garden || 1,800 || 23–18–6 || 52 || 
|- style="background:#cfc;"
| 48 || April 23 || Philadelphia || 4–1 || || Georgiev || Madison Square Garden || 1,800 || 24–18–6 || 54 || 
|- style="background:#cfc;"
| 49 || April 25 || Buffalo || 6–3 || || Shestyorkin || Madison Square Garden || 1,800 || 25–18–6 || 56 || 
|- style="background:#cfc;"
| 50 || April 27 || Buffalo || 3–1 || || Shestyorkin || Madison Square Garden || 1,796 || 26–18–6 || 58 || 
|- style="background:#fcc;"
| 51 || April 29 || NY Islanders || 0–4 || || Shestyorkin || Madison Square Garden || 1,800 || 26–19–6 || 58 || 
|-

|- style="background:#fcc;"
| 52 || May 1 || @ NY Islanders || 0–3 || || Georgiev || Nassau Coliseum || 1,400 || 26–20–6 || 58 || 
|- style="background:#fcc;"
| 53 || May 3 || Washington || 3–6 || || Shestyorkin || Madison Square Garden || 1,800 || 26–21–6 || 58 || 
|- style="background:#fcc;"
| 54 || May 5 || Washington || 2–4 || || Georgiev || Madison Square Garden || 1,800 || 26–22–6 || 58 || 
|- style="background:#fcc;"
| 55 || May 6 || @ Boston || 0–4 || || Shestyorkin || TD Garden || 2,191 || 26–23–6 || 58 || 
|- style="background:#cfc;"
| 56 || May 8 || @ Boston || 5–4 || || Shestyorkin || TD Garden || 2,191 || 27–23–6 || 60 || 
|-

|-
|

Player statistics
As of May 8, 2021

Skaters

Goaltenders

Awards and honors

Awards

Milestones

Records

Transactions
The Rangers were involved in the following transactions during the 2020–21 season.

Trades

Free agents

Signings

Draft picks

Below are the New York Rangers' selections at the 2020 NHL Entry Draft, which was held on October 6 and 7, 2020, in a remote format, with teams convening via videoconferencing, and Commissioner Gary Bettman announcing selections from the NHL Network studios in Secaucus, New Jersey. It was originally scheduled to be held on June 26–27, 2020, at the Bell Centre in Montreal, Quebec, but was postponed on March 25, 2020 due to the COVID-19 pandemic and the conclusion of the 2020 Stanley Cup playoffs.

Notes:
 The Calgary Flames' first-round pick went to the New York Rangers as the result of a trade on October 6, 2020, that sent Carolina Hurricanes' first-round pick and a third-round pick both in 2020 (22nd and 72nd overall) to Calgary in exchange for this pick.
 The Los Angeles Kings' second-round pick went to the New York Rangers as the result of a trade on October 7, 2020, that sent Lias Andersson to Los Angeles in exchange for this pick.
 The Dallas Stars' third-round pick went to the New York Rangers as the result of a trade on February 23, 2019, that sent Mats Zuccarello to Dallas in exchange for a conditional second-round pick in 2019 and this pick (being conditional at the time of the trade).
 The San Jose Sharks' fifth-round pick went to the New York Rangers as the result of a trade on October 7, 2020, that sent a seventh-round pick and Vancouver Canucks' seventh-round pick both in 2020 (196th and 206th overall) to San Jose in exchange for this pick.
 The Nashville Predators' seventh-round pick went to the New York Rangers as the result of a trade on February 6, 2019, that sent Cody McLeod to Nashville in exchange for this pick.

References

New York Rangers seasons
New York Rangers
New York Rangers
New York Rangers
New York Rangers
 in Manhattan
Madison Square Garden